Kelsie is a masculine and a feminine given name that may refer to:

Kelsie B. Harder (1922–2007), American professor and onomastician
Kelsie Ahbe (born 1991), Canadian-American female pole vaulter
Kelsie Hendry (born 1982), Canadian female pole vaulter

See also
 Kelsay (surname)
Kelsay
Kelsey (given name)
 Kelsey (surname)

English-language unisex given names
Unisex given names